Mitchell Kilduff (born 29 February 1996) is an Australian Paralympic swimmer. He was selected to represent Australia at the 2012 Summer Paralympics in swimming. He achieved 5th place in the 200 metre freestyle event at the 2012 Games.

Early life
Kilduff was born on 29 February 1996, and is from Carlton, New South Wales. He was diagnosed with autism when he was six years old. During his early school years, he faced considerable challenges.  Following that, he was home schooled. In 2009, he attended Endeavour Sports High School. , he is a student at Kingsgrove North High School while mentoring other swimmers with autism.

Swimming career
Kilduff is an S14 classified swimmer, who has set world records in several events including the long course 50m butterfly, 50m freestyle, the 100m butterfly, the 400m freestyle, and the source course 50m butterfly events in his classification. He is a member of SLC Aquadot and his coach is Gavin Stewart, who began coaching him in 2009. He has competed against able-bodied athletes.

Kilduff started swimming in 2006, and began taking lessons in 2007. In 2009, he was training seven days a week.

At the 2010 Australian national championships, Kilduff earned two gold medals. The following year at the same competition, he earned a total of seven medals, three of them gold. In 2011, he had nine swimming training sessions a week, with each session lasting about two hours. At the 2011 Australian Age Multi-Class Championships hosted at the Australian Institute of Sport pool, he won seven gold medals.

Kilduff first represented Australia in 2011, making his debut at the Arafura Games. At the Italian-hosted 2011 Global Games, he won a pair of silver medals and four gold medals.  His silver medals came in the 4 × 100 m freestyle relay event and the 200m freestyle event where he had a time of 2:03.12.  He earned a gold in the 50m freestyle event in a time of 25.78. He was selected to represent Australian Paralympics in swimming. He did not medal at the 2012 Games.

Personal bests

References

External links 
 
 

1996 births
Living people
Male Paralympic swimmers of Australia
Swimmers at the 2012 Summer Paralympics
Swimmers from Sydney
Swimmers at the 2014 Commonwealth Games
Commonwealth Games competitors for Australia
S14-classified Paralympic swimmers
People educated at Endeavour Sports High School
People on the autism spectrum
Australian male freestyle swimmers
Australian male backstroke swimmers
Australian male butterfly swimmers
Australian male breaststroke swimmers
Australian male medley swimmers
21st-century Australian people